Warlords II is computer wargame released in 1993, and the second release in the Warlords video game series.

An expansion pack, Warlords II Scenario Builder, was released in 1994. The updated version of the game, Warlords II Deluxe, was released in 1995. It allowed for custom tile, army and city sets for maps and provided support for 256 colours. Thanks to the publication of the editor, Warlords II Deluxe led to an increase of user-created content.  Many new maps, army and terrain sets, and scenarios were distributed on the Internet for the game.

Gameplay
Warlords II included five maps, although the later released mission pack increased the number. Another new feature was 'fog of war': optionally, enemy units or even the map could be concealed from players without units close enough to see them. The interface of the game was improved, as were the graphics (with additional unique city graphics for each different player). Moreover, the game featured multiple army, city, and terrain sets (still in 16 colours), play by e-mail as well as hot seat, and a random map generator and map editor.

Reception

Computer Gaming World in November 1993 stated that other than the lack of a better victory screen, "every other aspect of Warlord II is worthy of respect and admiration", praising the AI as "one of the finest on the market". The magazine in July 1994 stated that Scenario Builder "succeeds even though it lets you look behind the curtain of one of the most engaging game systems on the market". Rating the scenario editor four stars out of five, the magazine in August liked half of the 24 premade scenarios and concluded that it was "a terrific way to dabble in world creation".

Warlords II was a runner-up for Computer Gaming Worlds Wargame of the Year award in June 1994, losing to Clash of Steel. The editors wrote that the game "takes the award-winning game system and enhances it with more and randomly generated maps, and more diversity in unit types. The AI presses SSG's approach to a new high in versatility and competitiveness". However, it was named the best wargame of 1993 by Computer Games Strategy Plus.

In 1996, Computer Gaming World declared Warlords II the 77th-best computer game ever released.

Reviews
PC Games (Germany) – September 1993
ASM (Aktueller Software Markt) – October 1993
PC Player (Germany) – August 1993
Computer Gaming World – November 1993

References

External links
Warlords II at MobyGames
Warlords II at Internet Archive
Warlords II :: Summary — Summary table

1993 video games
Classic Mac OS games
Computer wargames
DOS games
Multiplayer hotseat games
Strategic Studies Group games
Turn-based strategy video games
Video games developed in Australia
Video games with expansion packs
Warlords (video game series)